A Beautiful Life is the second studio album from Mikeschair. Curb Records released the album on August 23, 2011. They worked with Matt Bronleewe in the production of this album.

Critical reception

Awarding the album four and a half stars at New Release Tuesday, Kevin Davis states, "A Beautiful Life...takes it up a notch", believing "Mike Grayson's vocals are stronger than ever and the encouraging and prayerful themes of this album are catchy, emotional and inspirational." Clay Morgan, giving the album three spins from Christian Broadcasting Network, writes, "This new album features more of the same, not much variety, but some tracks that will please listeners looking for songs of hope", where he replies "There's nothing groundbreaking here, but A Beautiful Life is a nice album."

Track listing

Chart performance

References

2014 albums
Mikeschair albums
Curb Records albums
Albums produced by Matt Bronleewe